Cow Island may refer to:
 Cow Island, Louisiana
 Cow Island, Maine
 Cow Island, Montana
 Cow Island, Ontario

See also
 Île-à-Vache (Vache is cow in French), Haiti
 Île aux Vaches in the Hochelaga Archipelago, Quebec
 Île aux Vaches on the Seine river in France, that later formed part of Île Saint-Louis
 Sea Cow Island, Indian Ocean
 Vache Island, Seychelles